The 1910–11 Football League season was Birmingham Football Club's 19th in the Football League and their 11th in the Second Division. Having finished bottom of the league in 1909–10, they had to apply for re-election to the League for 1910–11. They led the voting, ahead of Huddersfield Town who were elected to the league to replace Grimsby Town, who had finished the 1909–10 season in 19th place, above Birmingham.

Birmingham finished the season 16th in the 20-team division, and lost to Oldham Athletic in the first round of the FA Cup. Twenty-nine players made at least one appearance in nationally organised first-team competition, and there were fourteen different goalscorers. Half-back Thomas Daykin played in 37 matches over the 40-match season; only two other players reached 30 appearances. Jack Hall was leading scorer with 13 goals, of 14 which came in the league.

Watson resigned as secretary-manager at the end of the season, and the club decided to separate the roles of manager and secretary. Bob McRoberts, who had played as a forward for the club for seven years, was appointed as team manager, with no secretarial duties, and Watson's former assistant, Frank Richards, took over as secretary.

Football League Second Division

League table (part)

FA Cup

Appearances and goals

 * Wilcox retired during the season because of injury.

See also
Birmingham City F.C. seasons

References

Sources
 
 
 Source for match dates and results: 
 Source for lineups, appearances, goalscorers and attendances: . Note that attendance figures are estimated.
 Source for kit: 

Birmingham City F.C. seasons
Birmingham